Louis W. Pauly FRSC is the J. Stefan Dupré Distinguished Professor of Political Economy in the Department of Political Science of the University of Toronto, where he has held the Canada Research Chair in Globalization and Governance and served as Department Chair, Director of the Centre for International Studies, and Interim Director of the Centre for the Study of Global Japan in the Munk School of Global Affairs and Public Policy.  He is a Fellow of the Royal Society of Canada.

Biography
Pauly is a graduate of Cornell University, the London School of Economics, New York University, and Fordham University. He has held management positions in the Royal Bank of Canada and served on the staff of the International Monetary Fund. He is a former editor of the journal International Organization.

Publications
His publications include various books and co-edited volumes, including:
"Power in a Complex Global System" (2014) 
"Global Ordering: Institutions and Autonomy in a Changing World" (2009) 
Global Liberalism and Political Order:  Toward a New Grand Compromise? (2007) 
Complex Sovereignty:  Reconstituting Political Authority in the Twenty-First Century (2005) 
Governing the World's Money (2002) 
Democracy beyond the State? The European Dilemma and the Emerging Global Order (2000) 
The Myth of the Global Corporation (1998) 
Who Elected the Bankers? Surveillance and Control in the World Economy (1997) 
Choosing to Cooperate: How States Avoid Loss (1993) 
Opening Financial Markets: Banking Politics on the Pacific Rim (1988)

References

Alumni of the London School of Economics
Cornell University alumni
Canadian economists
New York University alumni
Fordham University alumni
Living people
Academic staff of the University of Toronto
Year of birth missing (living people)
Place of birth missing (living people)
Canada Research Chairs
Canadian economics writers
Political economists
Political science journal editors